Diocirea violacea is a plant in the figwort family (Scrophulariaceae), and is endemic to a small area near Salmon Gums in Western Australia. It is a low shrub with a restricted distribution but which often occurs in large numbers, forming a dense ground cover. It can be distinguished from the three others in its genus by a combination of the size and arrangement of its leaves and the appearance of its fruits.

Description
Its branches often have many short hairs and glands producing a resin that dries white.

The flowers are borne singly in leaf axils and lack a stalk. There are 5 egg-shaped, pointed green sepals with hairs on their edges. The tube is white, spotted purple on the inside and on the bases of the lobes. The tube is mostly glabrous except for a few hairs on the lower lobes. There are 4 stamens which extend slightly beyond the petal tube.

Taxonomy and naming
The specific epithet is derived from the "Latin violacea, violet, referring to the corolla colour".

Distribution and habitat
Diocirea violacea has a restricted distribution in a small area between Salmon Gums and Spargoville in the Coolgardie and Mallee biogeographic regions where it often grows as the dominant species on sandy, gravelly or clay soils.

Conservation
Diocirea violacea has been classified as "not threatened" by the Government of Western Australia Department of Parks and Wildlife.

References

violacea
Lamiales of Australia
Plants described in 2007
Endemic flora of Western Australia